Jorge Oliveira Calado (born 7 June 1942) is a Mozambican-Portuguese retired footballer who played as a midfielder.

Career
Born in Portuguese Mozambique, Jorge Calado is a youth product from S.L. Benfica. He made his professional debut on 26 November 1961, in a win over Caldas. Over the course of seven seasons, acting mainly as back-up to Mário Coluna or Domiciano Cavém, he played 27 league matches, with a loan deal in 1968–69 to Leixões S.C.

In 1971–72, he joined União de Tomar, and later had short spells in United States, retiring in 1981, age 39.

Honours
Benfica
Primeira Liga: 1963–64, 1964–65, 1966–67, 1967–68, 1970–71
Taça de Portugal: 1961-62, 1963-64, 1969–70

References

External links

1942 births
Living people
Colonial people in Mozambique
Mozambican emigrants to Portugal
Mozambican footballers
Portuguese footballers
Association football midfielders
Primeira Liga players
S.L. Benfica footballers
Leixões S.C. players
C.F. Os Belenenses players
Boston Minutemen players
Rochester Lancers (1967–1980) players
Portuguese expatriate footballers
Expatriate soccer players in the United States
North American Soccer League (1968–1984) players